Ronald L Sharman is a male former international table tennis player from England.

Table tennis career
Sharman won a bronze medal at the 1949 World Table Tennis Championships in the Swaythling Cup (men's team) event with Richard Bergmann, Johnny Leach, Aubrey Simons and Viktor Barna for England.

See also
 List of England players at the World Team Table Tennis Championships
 List of World Table Tennis Championships medalists

References

English male table tennis players
World Table Tennis Championships medalists